The R-7 Expressway is a proposed expressway in Metro Manila, Philippines that will be partially elevated and partially underground expressway. Originally proposed in 1993, the project will be constructed over the most heavily congested corridors in Metro Manila, namely Quezon Avenue and Commonwealth Avenue. The expressway will be connecting Quezon City and the City of Manila with high speed transport facility, thus decongest traffic of at-grade road. It might be implemented in 2016–2018. The project is believed to cost PhP 23.980 billion (US$532.89 million).

See also
Radial Road 7

References 

Proposed roads in the Philippines